Monster Ark is a television film that first aired on the Sci-Fi Channel on . It was directed by  Declan O'Brien and Renee O'Connor, Tim DeKay and Tommy Lister starred.

Plot
An archaeologist team finds what appears to be new undiscovered Dead Sea Scrolls in the Qumran Ruins, Israel. The scrolls are that of a much earlier Book of Genesis that claims that Noah had an ark before the famous Noah's Ark which was used to store the only surviving Nephilim. When they find this ark though, they have released it into the world, and the only way to stop it is to use Noah's Staff.

Cast
 Tim DeKay as Dr. Nicholas Zavaterro 
 Renee O'Connor as Dr. Ava Greenway  
 Tommy 'Tiny' Lister as Sergeant Major Gentry (Tommy Lister Jr.)  
 Amanda Crew as Joanna  
 Carlos Leon as Belus  
 Bill Parks as Russell  
 Richard Gnolfo as Wilson  
 Tommy Nohilly as Coles  
 Vlado Mihailov as Martinez (Vlado Mihaylov)  
 Mike Straub as Hutch (Michael Straub)  
 Stefan Shterev as Insurgent #1 (Stefan Shtereff)  
 Bashar Rahal as Insurgent #2 (Bashar Rahad)  
 Hristo Mitzkov as Belus' Lieutenant (Hristo Motzkov)  
 George Zlatarev as Captain Backhar  
 Velislav Pavlov as Laborer
 Dan Yarmolyuk as Mr. Fasanella
 Chris Thompson as Mr. Windheim
 Todd Jensen as Cain
 Atanas Srebrev as Noah

References

External links 
 
 

2008 television films
2008 films
Films shot in Bulgaria
Syfy original films
Films directed by Declan O'Brien
2000s English-language films
2000s American films